Prokopyevsky District is an administrative district (raion), one of the nineteen in Kemerovo Oblast, Russia. As a municipal division, it is incorporated as Prokopyevsky Municipal District. It is located in the center of the oblast. Its administrative center is the city of Prokopyevsk (which is not administratively a part of the district). Population:  33,705 (2002 Census);

Administrative and municipal status
Within the framework of administrative divisions, Prokopyevsky District is one of the nineteen in the oblast. The city of Prokopyevsk serves as its administrative center, despite being incorporated separately as a city under oblast jurisdiction—an administrative unit with the status equal to that of the districts.

As a municipal division, the district is incorporated as Prokopyevsky Municipal District. Prokopyevsk City Under Oblast Jurisdiction is incorporated separately from the district as Prokopyevsky Urban Okrug.

References

Notes

Sources

Districts of Kemerovo Oblast
